Christmas Gift is Kokia's eighth studio album, released in October/November 2008. It is her first full-length Christmas album, though she had released a special Christmas EP for fans, A Piece of Christmas, in November 2006. It is the final of four albums released in 2008 to celebrate her 10th anniversary as a singer.

One song from the album, "Kokoro no Rōsoku," features on Kokia's 2009 greatest hits collection Coquillage: The Best Collection II.

Recording

Kokia began recording the album in May 2008, though refused to mention what the sessions were for. In September, the album was still gradually being recorded, with Kokia working with producer Kiyohide Ura for several tracks. The album was confirmed in Kokia's blog on September the 1st, though recording was still continuing at this point.

Kokia also travelled to New York City for a week to record for her "Remember the Kiss Music Gift" project in early September. These sessions were for Kokia's special Music Gift EP, which featured Christmas recordings. One of the songs from these sessions, "Remember the Kiss (Dedicated to "New" NY)," was released as a bonus track on the Japanese edition. It was recorded on the organ with a church choir at the  Institutional Church of God Church in Brooklyn.

Song selection

Of the songs included in the album, 12 are covers and three are original Kokia songs (if counting medley songs and bonus tracks).

Of the covers, five are religious Christmas carols: "Amazing Grace," "It Came Upon the Midnight Clear," "The Little Drummer Boy," "The First Noël" and "We Three Kings of Orient Are". Four of the songs are secular Christmas songs: "I'll Be Home for Christmas," "Jingle Bells," "Let It Snow! Let It Snow! Let It Snow!" and "Santa Claus Is Comin' to Town." Three of these four secular songs are a part of the Christmas medley.

Two songs are covers of songs not directly related to Christmas by popular Western musicians. The first is Leonard Cohen's "Hallelujah," and the second is Queen's Japanese song, "Teo Torriatte (Let Us Cling Together)."

"Ave Maria" is a re-recording of the Vladimir Fyodorovich Vavilov classical piece of music, originally found on Kokia's The Voice album. In the Christmas Gift version it is sung in a different key, with different lyrics (Girolamo Savonarola's 1495 Hail Mary prayer in Latin).

Release

Much like Kokia's first album released on Wasabi Records, Aigakikoeru: Listen for the Love, it was released in France prior to the Japanese release. The French edition was released on October 22, three weeks before the Japanese release.

Christmas Gift was also simultaneously released in France  as a part of a 3CD set called Kokia Collection. The album also featured 2006's Aigakikoeru: Listen for the Love 2008's and The Voice, and featured a cover similar to the Christmas Gift photoshoot cover.

Reception

The album reached #56 on the Japanese Oricon albums charts, selling 3,000 copies. CDJournal called the album a "Christmas song selection you can enjoy with your family."

Track listing

The French and Japanese versions were released with different track orders. The Japanese version also had a bonus track, "Remember the Kiss (Dedicated to "New" NY)."

Japan sales rankings

References

Kokia (singer) albums
Victor Entertainment albums
2008 Christmas albums
Christmas albums by Japanese artists
Folk Christmas albums
Pop Christmas albums